Kustarevka is the name of several rural localities in Russia:
Kustarevka, Republic of Bashkortostan, a village in Tatyshlinsky District of the Republic of Bashkortostan
Kustarevka, Ryazan Oblast, a settlement in Sasovsky District of Ryazan Oblast